Setúbal is a city and a municipality in Portugal. The city itself had 89,303 inhabitants in 2001. It lies within the Lisbon metropolitan area.

In the times of Al-Andalus the city was known as Shaṭūbar. In the 19th century, the port was called Saint Ubes in English, and Saint-Yves in French.

The municipal holiday is 15 September, which marks the date in 1860 when King Pedro V of Portugal officially recognised Setúbal as a city.

City information

It is also the seat of the Setúbal District and  formerly in the historic Estremadura Province.

In the beginning of the 20th century, Setúbal was the most important center of Portugal's fishing industry, particularly specializing in processing and exporting sardines. None of the many factories then created are operating today. However, the existing maritime ports, either traditional, commercial and the new marines, keep the city links to the ocean and water well alive and vibrant.  Tourism, based on the beautiful existing natural conditions plus excellent hotels, resorts and infrastructures, is one of the city's most appreciated resources, due to its interconnection with the Sado (river) on one side and Atlantic Ocean on another, having a coast line with both. The city is also connected with the nearby coast of the Arrábida hills natural park - which offers an unspoiled nature and beautiful beaches to the Atlantic Ocean. A dolphin colony inhabits the Sado River. Across the river on the south bank lies the peninsula of Tróia, a place with vast white/golden sand beaches where several luxury hotels and resorts were recently built. The Tróia peninsula can be sighted from the city, across the river. Albarquel, Figueirinha, Galápos, Galapinhos, Creiro and Portinho da Arrábida are some of the city's many beaches, located in the north bank of the estuary, at the very beginning of the Arrábida hills.

History

In antiquity the city was known as Cetobriga, a Turdetani settlement that came under Roman control in the province of Lusitania.

Culture

The main historical monument of the city of Setúbal is the Monastery of Jesus, which is a 15th- and 16th-century church that represents one of the first buildings in the Portuguese late Gothic style known as Manueline.

Also of interest are the São Julião Church, also with Manueline portals. The Castelo de São Filipe, is a 16th- and 17th-century fortress on the north bank of the Sado river, overseeing the city. The fortress was converted into a luxury hotel (pousada).

Teatro Animação de Setúbal is based in Setúbal.

Demography (municipality)

Parishes

Administratively, the municipality is divided into 5 civil parishes (freguesias):
 Azeitão (São Lourenço e São Simão)
 Gâmbia – Pontes – Alto da Guerra
 
 São Julião, Nossa Senhora da Anunciada e Santa Maria da Graça
 São Sebastião

Climate 
Setúbal has a Mediterranean climate (Köppen: Csa) with mild, rainy winters and warm to hot, dry summers.

Economy

According to the census of 2011, the municipality of Setúbal had a labor force of 58,514 people, among whom 15.6% were unemployed. Among those who had a job, 1.6% were working in the Primary sector, 24.9% in the Secondary sector and 73.5% in the Tertiary sector. Setúbal is notable for the industries of pulp, paper, cement, fertilizers, pesticides, other phytopharmaceutical products, thermal power, shipbuilding and ship repair there was a lot of automobile assembling industry since the 1950s with several known manufacturers had or have opened assembly halls for the Portuguese market. Today there are only 3 tradenames nearby currently in production. The Port of Setúbal had a cargo throughput of 6.058 million tons in 2012, making it the 4th busiest port in Portugal, with 7.4% of the cargo throughput in the country.
In the 19th century, the area was notable for the production of sea salt. St. Ubes bay salt was exported as far as Australia in the 1830s.

Education

Escola Superior de Ciências Empresariais

Sports

The city's main sports club is Vitória de Setúbal, the football club established on 20 November 1910.

Notable residents and citizens

Public Service 

Diogo Fernandes Pereira (ca.15C-ca.16C) a 16th-century navigator; in 1503 the first European captain to visit the island of Socotra and discovered the Mascarenes archipelago (Réunion, Mauritius, and Rodrigues) in 1507
José Travassos Valdez, 1st Count of Bonfim (1787–1862) soldier, politician, Prime Minister of Portugal, 1839 to 1841
Rui Machete (born 1940) a Portuguese politician and Govt. minister

The Arts 

Manuel Maria Barbosa du Bocage (1765–1805) notable satirical and classical poet.
Luisa Todi (1753–1833) a Portuguese mezzo-soprano opera singer
João Vaz (1859-1931) a painter and decorator who specialized in maritime subjects.
Roy Campbell (1901–1957) a South African poet, died nearby in a car accident.
Sebastião da Gama (1924–1952) a Portuguese poet, he wrote about the Arrábida Natural Park
Lima de Freitas (1927–1998) Portuguese painter, illustrator, ceramicist and writer. 
Zeca Afonso (1929-1987) singer and songwriter, lived, worked and died in the city
Manuela Couto (born 1964) a Portuguese actress on TV, cinema and theatre.
Luís Buchinho (born 1969) a Portuguese fashion designer.
Mazgani (born 1974) an Iranian-Portuguese singer-songwriter.
Sofia Vitória (born 1979) singer of Jazz & World Music
Sabrina (born 1982) represented Portugal at the Eurovision Song Contest 2007.
André Marques (born 1984) writer and director.
Filipa Barroso, (Wiki PT) (born 1998) model and Miss Portuguesa 2017
Matilde Lima, (Wiki PT) (born 1999) model and Miss Universo Portugal 2017

Sport 

Francisco Santos (footballer) (1904 - ?)
Oceana Zarco (1911–2008) first Portuguese female professional cyclist, in 1925
Jaime Graça (1942–2012) a footballer and coach with 303 club caps and 36 for Portugal 
Silvino Louro (born 1959) a former footballer with 408 club caps and 23 for Portugal 
José Mourinho (born 1963) distinguished football manager.
Fernando Mendes (born 1966) a former footballer with 350 club caps and 11 for Portugal 
Bruno Ribeiro (born 1975) a football manager and former player with 305 club caps  
Bruno Lage (born 1976) a football manager, head coach of Wolverhampton Wanderers F.C.
Susana Costa (born 1984) a Portuguese athlete specialising in the triple jump
Marco Soares (born 1984) a footballer with over 370 club caps and 49 for Cape Verde

International relations

Setúbal is twinned with:

Setúbal has international cooperation protocols with:

Gallery

References

Bibliography

External links

 Town Hall official website
 O Bocagiano Local News
 Setúbal na Rede is a pioneering project, innovative and the first digital-only newspaper in Portugal.
 Setúbal Walking Tour (Youtube)
Largo De Jesus to Train Station Walking Tour  (Youtube)
Fishing Port to Albarquel Park Walking Tour (Youtube)
Viewpoint Of S. Sebastião, Praça Do Quebedo Walking Tour (Youtube)
Abandoned Boats In Setúbal  (Youtube)

 
Cities in Portugal
Port cities and towns in Portugal
Phoenician colonies in Portugal
Populated places in Setúbal District
Municipalities of Setúbal District